Busse Nutley (born January 2, 1949) is an American politician who served in the Washington House of Representatives from the 49th district from 1985 to 1991.

References

1949 births
Living people
Democratic Party members of the Washington House of Representatives
Women state legislators in Washington (state)